Ryan Samir Patel (born 26 October 1997) is an English cricketer. He made his first-class debut for Surrey in the 2017 County Championship on 28 August 2017.

In June 2018, during the 2018 County Championship match against Somerset, he took his maiden five-wicket haul in first-class cricket, with six wickets for five runs in eleven balls. He made his List A debut on 30 April 2019, for Surrey in the 2019 Royal London One-Day Cup. He made his Twenty20 debut on 26 July 2019, for Surrey in the 2019 t20 Blast.

References

External links
 

1997 births
Living people
English cricketers
Surrey cricketers
Cricketers from Greater London